HKSI Pro Cycling Team is a Hong Kong-based UCI Continental cycling team established in 2014, based at the Hong Kong Sports Institute.

Team roster

Major wins
2014
 National Time Trial championships, Cheung King Lok
 National U23 Time Trial championships, Leung Chun Wing
 National Road Race championships, Cheung King Lok
2015
Stage 1 Tour de Ijen, Cheung King Lok
Stage 4 Tour de Ijen, Leung Chun Wing
 National Road Race championships, Siu Wai Ko
 National Time Trial championships, Cheung King Lok
2016
Asian Cycling Championships ITT, Cheung King Lok
2017
 National Road Race championships, Leung Chun Wing
 National Time Trial championships, Leung Chun Wing
 National U23 Time Trial championships, Fung Ka Hoo
2018
 National Road Race championships, Siu Wai Ko
 National Time Trial championships, Ho Burr
2019
 National Road Race championships, Cheung King Lok
 National Time Trial championships, Fung Ka Hoo
 National U23 Time Trial championships, Pak Hang Ng
2020
Stage 2 Cambodia Bay Cycling Tour, Choy Hiu Fung
Mountains classification Cambodia Bay Cycling Tour, Choy Hiu Fung

References

External links

UCI Continental Teams (Asia)
Cycling teams established in 2014
Cycling teams based in Hong Kong
2014 establishments in Hong Kong